Lourival Júnior de Araújo Lopes (born 19 October 1987), known as Júnior Lopes, is a Brazilian retired footballer.

Honours

Club
Uthai Thani
Thai League 3 (1): 2021–22
Thai League 3 Northern Region (1): 2021–22

References

External links

Júnior Lopes at playmakerstats.com (English version of ogol.com.br)

1987 births
Living people
People from Porto Velho
Brazilian footballers
Association football defenders
Campeonato Brasileiro Série B players
Campeonato Brasileiro Série C players
Campeonato Brasileiro Série D players
Esporte Clube Vitória players
Ituano FC players
Sociedade Esportiva do Gama players
Clube Atlético Bragantino players
Nova Iguaçu Futebol Clube players
Goiás Esporte Clube players
NK Čelik Zenica players
Saipa F.C. players
Paraná Clube players
Guarany Sporting Club players
Oeste Futebol Clube players
Boa Esporte Clube players
Persiba Balikpapan players
Sertãozinho Futebol Clube players
Botafogo Futebol Clube (PB) players
Madureira Esporte Clube players
Associação Desportiva Confiança players
Horizonte Futebol Clube players
Primeira Liga players
Associação Académica de Coimbra – O.A.F. players
Liga 1 (Indonesia) players
Persian Gulf Pro League players
Junior Lopes
Junior Lopes
Brazilian expatriate footballers
Brazilian expatriate sportspeople in Bosnia and Herzegovina
Expatriate footballers in Bosnia and Herzegovina
Brazilian expatriate sportspeople in Portugal
Expatriate footballers in Portugal
Expatriate footballers in Iran
Brazilian expatriate sportspeople in Thailand
Expatriate footballers in Thailand
Sportspeople from Rondônia